The Sewri Christian Cemetery (Marathi: शिवडी ख्रिस्ती  स्मशान भूमि  Sewrī Kristi smashan bhumi) in Sewri, Mumbai, India, was established by Arthur Crawford, the first Municipal Commissioner of Bombay as a location for European burials. The land was acquired from the Agri-Horticulture Society's gardens in 1865.
The bodies of Commonwealth military service personnel buried in the cemetery during the First and Second World Wars were all exhumed and reburied at Kirkee War Cemetery where permanent maintenance by the Commonwealth War Graves Commission could be assured, with the exception of a Second World War soldier of the Women's Auxiliary Corps (India) whose grave is still registered and maintained by the commission.

People buried

Gallery

Notes

External links
 
 

Cemeteries in India
Buildings and structures in Mumbai
Christian cemeteries
1864 establishments in India